Šindelář (feminine Šindelářová) is a Czech surname, that is derived from the German word "schindel" which means "shingle". Notable people include:

 Charles Sindelar, American illustrator
 Filip Šindelář, Czech ice hockey player
 Jakub Šindelář, Czech handball player
 Jan Šindelář, Czech bobsledder
 Joan Sindelar, American baseball player
 Joey Sindelar, American golfer
 Matthias Sindelar, Austrian footballer
 Paul Sindelar, American professor
 Petr Šindelář, Czech snowboarder

See also 
 Schindler

Czech-language surnames
Occupational surnames